Michael Grant Ignatieff  (born May 12, 1947) is a Canadian author, academic and former politician who served as the leader of the Liberal Party of Canada and Leader of the Official Opposition from 2008 until 2011. Known for his work as a historian, Ignatieff has held senior academic posts at the universities of Cambridge, Oxford, Harvard, and Toronto. Most recently, he was rector and President of Central European University; he held this position from 2016 until July 2021.

While living in the United Kingdom from 1978 to 2000, Ignatieff became well known as a television and radio broadcaster and as an editorial columnist for The Observer. His documentary series Blood and Belonging: Journeys into the New Nationalism aired on BBC in 1993, and won a Canadian Gemini Award. His book of the same name, based on the series, won the Gordon Montador Award for Best Canadian Book on Social Issues and the University of Toronto's Lionel Gelber Prize. His memoir, The Russian Album, won Canada's Governor General's Literary Award and the British Royal Society of Literature's Heinemann Prize in 1988. His novel, Scar Tissue, was short-listed for the Booker Prize in 1994. In 2000, he delivered the Massey Lectures, entitled The Rights Revolution, which was released in print later that year.

In the 2006 federal election, Ignatieff was elected to the House of Commons as the member of Parliament (MP) for Etobicoke—Lakeshore. The same year, he ran for the leadership of the Liberal Party, ultimately losing to Stéphane Dion. He served as the party's deputy leader under Dion. After Dion's resignation in the wake of the 2008 election, Ignatieff served as interim leader from December 2008 until he was elected leader at the party's May 2009 convention. In the 2011 federal election, Ignatieff lost his own seat in the Liberal Party's worst showing in its history. Winning only 34 seats, the party placed a distant third behind the Conservatives and NDP, and thus lost its position as the Official Opposition. Ignatieff subsequently resigned as leader of the Liberal Party, and in effect retired from active politics, in May 2011.

Following his electoral defeat, Ignatieff taught at the University of Toronto. In 2013, he returned to Harvard Kennedy School part-time, splitting his time between Harvard and Toronto. On July 1, 2014, he returned to Harvard full-time. In 2016, he left Harvard to become president and rector of the Central European University in Budapest; he resigned from this position in July 2021. He continues to publish articles and essays on international affairs as well as Canadian politics.

Early life and education 
Ignatieff was born on May 12, 1947, in Toronto, the elder son of Russian-born Canadian Rhodes Scholar and diplomat George Ignatieff, and his Canadian-born wife, Jessie Alison (née Grant). Ignatieff's family moved abroad frequently in his early childhood as his father rose in the diplomatic ranks.

At the age of 11, Ignatieff was sent back to Toronto to attend Upper Canada College as a boarder in 1959. At UCC, he was elected a school prefect as head of Wedd's House, was the captain of the varsity soccer team, and served as editor-in-chief of the school's yearbook. As well, Ignatieff volunteered for the Liberal Party during the 1965 federal election by canvassing the York South riding. He resumed his work for the Liberal Party in 1968, as a national youth organizer and delegate for Pierre Trudeau's leadership campaign.

After high school, Ignatieff studied history at the University of Toronto's Trinity College (B.A., 1969). There, he met fellow student Bob Rae, from University College, who was a debating opponent and fourth-year roommate. After completing his undergraduate degree, Ignatieff took up his studies at the University of Oxford, where he studied under, and was influenced by, the liberal philosopher Sir Isaiah Berlin, whom he would later write about. While an undergraduate at the University of Toronto, he was a part-time reporter for The Globe and Mail in 1964–65. In 1976, Ignatieff completed his Ph.D. in history at Harvard University. He was granted a Cambridge M.A. by incorporation in 1978 on taking up a fellowship at King's College there.

Family 

Ignatieff's paternal grandfather was Count Pavel Ignatieff, the Russian minister of education during the First World War and son of Count Nikolay Pavlovich Ignatyev, an important Russian statesman and diplomat. His mother's grandfathers were George Monro Grant and Sir George Robert Parkin, and her younger brother was the Canadian Conservative political philosopher George Grant (1918–1988), author of Lament for a Nation. His great-aunt Alice Parkin Massey was the wife of Canada's first native-born Governor General, Vincent Massey. He is also a descendant of William Lawson, the first president of the Bank of Nova Scotia.

Ignatieff is married to Hungarian-born Zsuzsanna M. Zsohar and has two children, Theo and Sophie, from his first marriage to Londoner Susan Barrowclough. He also has a younger brother, Andrew, a community worker who assisted with Ignatieff's campaign.

Although he says he is not religious, Ignatieff was raised Russian Orthodox and occasionally attends services with family. He describes himself as neither an atheist nor a "believer".

University professor, writer, broadcaster

Early career 
Ignatieff was an assistant professor of history at the University of British Columbia from 1976 to 1978. In 1978 he moved to the United Kingdom, where he held a senior research fellowship at King's College, Cambridge, until 1984. He then left Cambridge for London, where he began to focus on his career as a writer and journalist. His book The Russian Album documented a history of his family's experiences in nineteenth-century Russia (and subsequent exile), and won the 1987 Governor General's Award for Non-Fiction and the British Royal Society of Literature's Heinemann Prize in Canada.

During this time, he travelled extensively. He also continued to lecture at universities in Europe and North America, and held teaching posts at Oxford, the University of London, the London School of Economics, the University of California and in France. While living in Britain, Ignatieff became well known as a broadcaster on radio and television. His best-known television work has been Voices on Channel 4, the BBC 2 discussion programme Thinking Aloud and BBC 2's arts programme, The Late Show.  He was also an editorial columnist for The Observer from 1990 to 1993.

His documentary series Blood and Belonging: Journeys into the New Nationalism aired on BBC in 1993, winning a Canadian Gemini Award. He later adapted this series into a book, Blood and Belonging: Journeys into the New Nationalism, detailing the dangers of ethnic nationalism in the post-Cold War period. This book won the Gordon Montador Award for Best Canadian Book on Social Issues and the University of Toronto's Lionel Gelber Prize. Ignatieff also wrote the novel, Scar Tissue, which was shortlisted for the Booker Prize in 1994.

In 1998, he was on the first panel of the long-running BBC Radio discussion series In Our Time. Around this time, his 1998 biography of Isaiah Berlin was shortlisted for both the Jewish Quarterly Literary Prize for Non-Fiction and the James Tait Black Memorial Prize.

Human rights policy 
In 2000, Ignatieff accepted a position as the director of the Carr Center for Human Rights Policy at the Harvard Kennedy School at Harvard University. Ignatieff's influence on policy continued to grow, helping to prepare the report The Responsibility to Protect for the International Commission on Intervention and State Sovereignty with Gareth Evans. This report examined the role of international involvement in Kosovo and Rwanda, and advocated a framework for 'humanitarian' intervention in future humanitarian crises. He delivered the Massey Lectures in 2000, entitled The Rights Revolution, which was released in print later that year. He would eventually become a participant and panel leader at the World Economic Forum in Geneva.

2001 marked the September 11 attacks in the United States, renewing academic interest in issues of foreign policy and nation building. Ignatieff's text on Western interventionist policies and nation building, Virtual War: Kosovo and Beyond, won the Orwell Prize for political non-fiction in 2001. As a journalist, Ignatieff observed that the United States had established "an empire lite, a global hegemony whose grace notes are free markets, human rights and democracy, enforced by the most awesome military power the world has ever known." This became the subject of his 2003 book Empire Lite: Nation-Building in Bosnia, Kosovo and Afghanistan, which argued that America had a responsibility to create a "humanitarian empire" through nation-building and, if necessary, military force. This would become a frequent topic in his lectures. At the Amnesty 2005 Lecture in Dublin, he offered evidence to show that "we wouldn't have international human rights without the leadership of the United States".

Ignatieff's interventionist approach led him to support the 2003 Invasion of Iraq. According to Ignatieff, the United States had a duty to expend itself unseating Iraqi president Saddam Hussein in the interests of international security and human rights. Ignatieff initially accepted the argument of George W. Bush administration that containment through sanctions and threats would not prevent Hussein from selling weapons of mass destruction to international terrorists. Ignatieff wrongly believed that those weapons were still being developed in Iraq.

In 2004, he published The Lesser Evil: Political Ethics in an Age of Terror, a philosophical work analyzing human rights in the post-9/11 world. Ignatieff argued that there may be circumstances where indefinite detention or coercive interrogations may need to be used on terror suspects to combat terrorism. Democratic institutions would need to evolve to protect human rights, finding a way to keep these necessary evils from offending democracy as much as the evils they are meant to prevent. The book attracted considerable attention. It was a finalist for the Lionel Gelber Prize, but also earned him some criticism. In 2005, he was criticized by his peers on the editorial board for the Index on Censorship, where human rights advocate Conor Gearty said Ignatieff fell into a category of "hand-wringing, apologetic apologists for human-rights abuses". Ignatieff responded by resigning from the editorial board for the Index, and has maintained that he supports a complete ban on torture.

By 2005, Ignatieff's writings on human rights and foreign affairs earned him the 37th rank on a list of most influential public intellectuals prepared by Prospect and Foreign Policy magazines.

Return to Canadian academia 

Around 2005, Ignatieff became more frequently mentioned as a possible Liberal candidate for the next federal election, and rumours swirled about the beginnings of a political career. At this time, he left Harvard to become the Chancellor Jackman Professor in Human Rights Policy at the University of Toronto and a senior fellow of the university's Munk Centre for International Studies.

He continued to write about the subject of Iraq, reiterating his support, if not the method in which it was conducted.
According to Ignatieff, "what Saddam Hussein had done to the Kurds and the Shia" in Iraq was sufficient justification for the invasion. His support for the war began to wane as time passed; he said: "I supported an administration whose intentions I didn't trust, believing that the consequences would repay the gamble. Now I realize that intentions do shape consequences." He eventually recanted his support for the war entirely. In a 2007 New York Times Magazine article, he wrote: "The unfolding catastrophe in Iraq has condemned the political judgment of a president, but it has also condemned the judgment of many others, myself included, who as commentators supported the invasion." Ignatieff partly interpreted what he now saw as his particular errors of judgment, by presenting them as typical of academics and intellectuals in general, whom he characterized as "generalizing and interpreting particular facts as instances of some big idea". In politics, by contrast, "Specifics matter more than generalities". Samuel Moyn, Harvard University historian of human rights and humanitarian intervention, asserts that Ignatieff is among those whose who "soiled their reputations" through their defence of the Iraq war, and labelled his later public apology "embarrassingly vacuous."

Post politics academic career and return to Harvard
In mid-2011, following his electoral defeat, Ignatieff became a senior resident with the University of Toronto's Massey College, where he taught courses in law and political science for the Munk School of Global Affairs, the School of Public Policy and Governance, and the Faculty of Law. In January 2013, Ignatieff rejoined the Harvard Kennedy School and divided his time between Toronto and Cambridge, Massachusetts. The next year, Ignatieff returned to Harvard full-time, and left the University of Toronto, to become Edward R. Murrow Chair of Press, Politics and Public Policy at the Harvard Kennedy School effective July 1, 2014.

President and Rector of Central European University

On May 5, 2016, it was announced that Michael Ignatieff would succeed John Shattuck to become the fifth president and rector of the Central European University (CEU) in Budapest, Hungary. On September 1, he was appointed the rector with the term ending on August 31, 2021.

Ignatieff oversaw a tumultuous period in the university's history, during which it accused the Hungarian government of challenging its legal right to continue to operate in Hungary. The position of Ignatieff and CEU was that the intervention from the Hungarian government was part of a wider vendetta on the part of prime minister Viktor Orbán against wealthy financier George Soros, the university's chief benefactor. Ignatieff's personal position was that the strain between the Hungarian government and CEU is part of a wider tension in Europe between democratic ideals and authoritarian tendencies within the European conservative right.

In 2019, Ignatieff was awarded the Dan David Prize for his contribution to defending democracy. During this time he continued to publish in scholarly journals. An example is The Responsibility to Protect in a Changing World Order: Twenty Years since Its Inception, an August 2021 article of his.

On 31 July 2021 Ignatieff stepped down as rector of CEU to be replaced by Shalini Randeria and announced he would step back into the classroom as a professor of history at CEU in January, 2022.

Writings 
Ignatieff is a historian, a fiction writer and public intellectual who has written several books on international relations and nation building. He has written seventeen books, and has been described by the British Arts Council as "an extraordinarily versatile writer", in both the style and the subjects he writes about. He has contributed articles to publications including The Globe and Mail, The New Republic, and The New York Times Magazine. Maclean's named him among the "Top 10 Canadian Who's Who" in 1997 and one of the "50 Most Influential Canadians Shaping Society" in 2002. In 2003, Maclean's named him Canada's "Sexiest Cerebral Man".

Fictional works 
His fictional works, Asya, Scar Tissue, and Charlie Johnson in the Flames cover, respectively, the life and travels of a Russian girl, the disintegration of one's mother due to neurological disease, and the haunting memories of a journalist in Kosovo. The works are to some extent autobiographical; for instance, Ignatieff travelled to the Balkans and Kurdistan while working as a journalist, witnessing first hand the consequences of modern ethnic warfare.

Historian and biographer 
A historian by training, he wrote A Just Measure of Pain, a history of prisons during the Industrial Revolution. His biography of Isaiah Berlin reveals the strong impression the celebrated philosopher made on Ignatieff. Philosophical writings by Ignatieff include The Needs of Strangers and The Rights Revolution. The latter work explores social welfare and community, and shows Berlin's influence on Ignatieff. These tie closely to Ignatieff's political writings on national self-determination and the imperatives of democratic self-government. Ignatieff has also written extensively on international affairs. His historical memoir, The Russian Album, traces his family's life in Russia and their troubles and subsequent emigration as a result of the Bolshevik Revolution.

Canadian studies 
In The Rights Revolution, Ignatieff identifies three aspects of Canada's approach to human rights that give the country its distinctive culture: 1) On moral issues, Canadian law is secular and liberal, approximating European standards more closely than American ones; 2) Canadian political culture is social democratic, and Canadians take it for granted that citizens have the right to free health care and public assistance; 3) Canadians place a particular emphasis on group rights, expressed in Quebec's language laws and in treaty agreements that recognize collective aboriginal rights. "Apart from New Zealand, no other country has given such recognition to the idea of group rights", he writes.

Ignatieff states that despite its admirable commitment to equality and group rights, Canadian society still places an unjust burden on women and gays and lesbians, and he says it is still difficult for newcomers of non-British or French descent to form an enduring sense of citizenship. He attributes this to the "patch-work quilt of distinctive societies", emphasizing that civic bonds will only be easier when the understanding of Canada as a multinational community is more widely shared.

International studies 
Ignatieff has written extensively on international development, peacekeeping and the international responsibilities of Western nations. Blood and Belonging, a 1993 work, explores the duality of nationalism, from Yugoslavia to Northern Ireland. It is the first of a trilogy of books that explore modern conflicts. The Warrior's Honour, published in 1998, deals with ethnically motivated conflicts, including the conflicts in Afghanistan and Rwanda. The final book, Virtual War, describes the problems of modern peacekeeping, with special reference to the NATO presence in Kosovo.

His 2003 book Empire Lite attracted considerable attention for suggesting that America, the world's last remaining superpower, should create a "humanitarian empire". This book continued his criticism of the limited-risk approach practiced by NATO in conflicts like the Kosovo War and the Rwandan genocide. Ignatieff became an advocate for more active involvement and larger scale deployment of land forces by Western nations in future conflicts in the developing world. Ignatieff was originally a prominent supporter of the 2003 Invasion of Iraq. However, Ignatieff attempts to distinguish the empire lite approach from neo-conservativism because the motives of the foreign engagement he advocates are essentially altruistic rather than self-serving.

Ignatieff's 2004 book The Lesser Evil: Political Ethics in an Age of Terror, argued that Western democracies may have to resort to "lesser evils" like indefinite detention of suspects, coercive interrogations, assassinations, and pre-emptive wars in order to combat the greater evil of terrorism. He states that as a result, societies should strengthen their democratic institutions to keep these necessary evils from becoming as offensive to freedom and democracy as the threats they are meant to prevent. The 'Lesser Evil' approach has been criticized by some prominent human rights advocates, like Conor Gearty, for incorporating a problematic form of moral language that can be used to legitimize forms of torture.
But other human rights advocates, like Human Rights Watch's Kenneth Roth, have defended Ignatieff, saying his work "cannot fairly be equated with support for torture or 'torture lite'."
In the context of this "lesser evil" analysis, Ignatieff has discussed whether or not liberal democracies should employ coercive interrogation and torture. Ignatieff has adamantly maintained that he supports a complete ban on torture.
His definition of torture, according to his 2004 Op-ed in The New York Times, does not include "forms of sleep deprivation that do not result in lasting harm to mental or physical health, together with disinformation and disorientation (like keeping prisoners in hoods)."

Political career 
In 2004, three Liberal organizers, former Liberal candidate Alfred Apps, Ian Davey (son of Senator Keith Davey) and lawyer Daniel Brock, travelled to Cambridge, Massachusetts, to convince Ignatieff to move back to Canada and run for the House of Commons of Canada, and to consider a possible bid for the Liberal leadership should Paul Martin retire. Rocco Rossi, who was at that time a key Liberal Party organizer, had previously mentioned to Davey that Davey's father had said that Ignatieff had "the makings of a prime minister". In January 2005, as a result of the efforts of Apps, Brock and Davey, press speculation that Ignatieff could be a star candidate for the Liberals in the next election, and possibly a candidate to eventually succeed Prime Minister Paul Martin, the leader of the governing Liberal Party of Canada.

After months of rumours and several denials, Ignatieff confirmed in November 2005 that he would run for a seat in the House of Commons in the winter 2006 election. It was announced that Ignatieff would seek the Liberal nomination in the Toronto riding of Etobicoke—Lakeshore.

Some Ukrainian-Canadian members of the riding association objected to the nomination, citing a perceived anti-Ukrainian sentiment in Blood and Belonging, where Ignatieff said: "I have reasons to take the Ukraine seriously indeed. But, to be honest, I'm having trouble. Ukrainian independence conjures up images of peasants in embroidered shirts, the nasal whine of ethnic instruments, phony Cossacks in cloaks and boots..."
Critics also questioned his commitment to Canada, pointing out that Ignatieff had lived outside of Canada for more than 30 years and had referred to himself as an American many times. When asked about it by Peter Newman in a Maclean's interview published on April 6, 2006, Ignatieff said: "Sometimes you want to increase your influence over your audience by appropriating their voice, but it was a mistake. Every single one of the students from 85 countries who took my courses at Harvard knew one thing about me: I was that funny Canadian."
Two other candidates filed for the nomination but were disqualified (one, because he was not a member of the party and the second because he had failed to resign from his position on the riding association executive). Ignatieff went on to defeat the Conservative candidate by a margin of roughly 5,000 votes to win the seat.

Leadership bid 
After the Liberal government was defeated in the January 2006 federal election, Paul Martin resigned the party leadership in March that same year. On April 7, 2006, Ignatieff announced his candidacy in the upcoming Liberal leadership race, joining several others who had already declared their candidacy.

Ignatieff received several high-profile endorsements of his candidacy. His campaign was headed by Senator David Smith, who had been a Chrétien organizer, along with Ian Davey, Daniel Brock, Alfred Apps and Paul Lalonde, a Toronto lawyer and son of Marc Lalonde.

An impressive team of policy advisors was assembled, led by Toronto lawyer Brad Davis, and including Brock, fellow lawyers Mark Sakamoto, Sachin Aggarwal, Jason Rosychuck, Jon Penney, Nigel Marshman, Alex Mazer, Will Amos, and Alix Dostal, former Ignatieff student Jeff Anders, banker Clint Davis, economists Blair Stransky, Leslie Church and Ellis Westwood, and Liberal operatives Alexis Levine, Marc Gendron, Mike Pal, Julie Dzerowicz, Patrice Ryan, Taylor Owen and Jamie Macdonald.

Following the selection of delegates in the party's "Super Weekend" exercise on the last weekend of September, Ignatieff gained more support from delegates than other candidates with 30% voting for him.

In August 2006, Ignatieff said he was "not losing any sleep" over dozens of civilian deaths caused by Israel's attack on Qana during its military actions in Lebanon.
Ignatieff recanted those words the following week. Then, on October 11, 2006, Ignatieff described the Qana attack as a war crime (committed by Israel). Susan Kadis, who had been Ignatieff's campaign co-chair, withdrew her support following the comment. Other Liberal leadership candidates have also criticized Ignatieff's comments.
Ariela Cotler, a Jewish community leader and the wife of prominent Liberal MP Irwin Cotler, left the party following Ignatieff's comments.
Ignatieff later qualified his statement, saying "Whether war crimes were committed in the attack on Qana is for international bodies to determine.  That doesn't change the fact that Qana was a terrible tragedy."

On October 14, Ignatieff announced that he would visit Israel, to meet with Israeli and Palestinian leaders and "learn first-hand their view of the situation". He noted that Amnesty International, Human Rights Watch and Israel's own B'Tselem have stated that war crimes were committed in Qana, describing the suggestion as "a serious matter precisely because Israel has a record of compliance, concern and respect for the laws of war and human rights".
Ignatieff added that he would not meet with Palestinian leaders who did not recognize Israel. However, the Jewish organization sponsoring the trip subsequently cancelled it, because of too much media attention.

Montreal Convention 
At the leadership convention in Montreal, taking place at Palais des Congrès, Ignatieff entered as the apparent front-runner, having won more delegates to the convention than any other contender. However, polls consistently showed he had weak second-ballot support, and those delegates not already tied to him would be unlikely to support him later.

On December 1, 2006, Ignatieff led the leadership candidates on the first ballot, garnering 29% support. The subsequent ballots were cast the following day, and Ignatieff managed a small increase, to 31% on the second ballot, good enough to maintain his lead over Bob Rae, who had attracted 24% support, and Stéphane Dion, who garnered 20%. However, due to massive movement towards Dion by delegates who supported Gerard Kennedy, Ignatieff dropped to second on the third ballot. Shortly before voting for the third ballot was completed, with the realization that there was a Dion–Kennedy pact, Ignatieff campaign co-chair Denis Coderre made an appeal to Rae to join forces and prevent Dion from winning the Liberal Party leadership (on the basis that Stephane Dion's ardent federalism would alienate Quebecers), but Rae turned down the offer and opted to release his delegates.

With the help of the Kennedy delegates, Dion jumped up to 37% support on the third ballot, in contrast to Ignatieff's 34% and Rae's 29%. Rae was eliminated and the bulk of his delegates opted to vote for Dion rather than Ignatieff. In the fourth and final round of voting, Ignatieff took 2084 votes and lost the contest to Dion, who won with 2,521 votes.

Ignatieff confirmed that he would run as the Liberal MP for Etobicoke—Lakeshore in the next federal election.

Deputy leadership 
On December 18, 2006, new Liberal leader Stéphane Dion named Ignatieff his deputy leader, in line with Dion's plan to give high-ranking positions to each of his former leadership rivals.

During three by-elections held on September 18, 2007, the Halifax Chronicle-Herald reported that unidentified Dion supporters were accusing Ignatieff's supporters of undermining by-election efforts, with the goal of showing that Dion could not hold on to the party's Quebec base.
Susan Delacourt of the Toronto Star described this as a recurring issue in the party with the leadership runner-up. The National Post referred to the affair as, "Discreet signs of a mutiny."
Although Ignatieff called Dion to deny the allegations, The Globe and Mail cited the NDP's widening lead after the article's release, suggested that the report had a negative impact on the Liberals' morale. The Liberals were defeated in their former stronghold of Outremont. Since then, Ignatieff has urged the Liberals to put aside their differences, saying "united we win, divided we lose".

Interim leadership of the Liberal Party 

Dion announced that he would schedule his departure as Liberal leader for the next party convention, after the Liberals lost seats and support in the 2008 federal election. Ignatieff held a news conference on November 13, 2008, to once again announce his candidacy for the leadership of the Liberal Party of Canada.

When the Liberals reached an accord with the other opposition parties to form a coalition and defeat the government, Ignatieff reluctantly endorsed it. He was reportedly uncomfortable with a coalition with the NDP and support from the Bloc Québécois, and has been described as one of the last Liberals to sign on.
After the announcement to prorogue Parliament, delaying the non-confidence motion until January 2009, Dion announced his intention to stay on as leader until the party selected a new one.

Leadership contender Dominic LeBlanc dropped out and threw his support behind Ignatieff. On December 9, the other remaining opponent for the Liberal Party leadership, Bob Rae, withdrew from the race, leaving Ignatieff as the presumptive winner.
On December 10, he was formally declared the interim leader in a caucus meeting, and his position was ratified at the May 2009 convention.

On February 19, 2009, during U.S. President Barack Obama's election visit to Ottawa to meet Prime Minister Stephen Harper, which was the President's first foreign trip since taking office, Obama also met with Ignatieff as per parliamentary protocol where the leader of the opposition meets foreign dignitaries. Their discussion included climate change, Afghanistan and human rights.

Leadership 
On May 2, 2009, Ignatieff was officially endorsed as the leader of the Liberal Party by 97% of delegates at the party convention in Vancouver, British Columbia.
The vote was mostly a formality as the other candidates had stepped down.

On August 31, 2009, Ignatieff announced that the Liberal Party would withdraw support for the government of Prime Minister Stephen Harper. However, the NDP under Jack Layton abstained and the Conservatives survived the confidence motion.
Ignatieff's attempt to force a September 2009 election was reported as a miscalculation, as polls showed that most Canadians did not want another election. Ignatieff's popularity as well as that of the Liberals dropped off considerably immediately afterwards.

On March 25, 2011, Ignatieff introduced a motion of non-confidence against the Harper government to attempt to force a May 2011 federal election after the government was found to be in contempt of Parliament, the first such occurrence in Commonwealth history. The House of Commons passed the motion by 156–145.

The Liberals had considerable momentum when the writ was dropped, and Ignatieff successfully squeezed NDP leader Jack Layton out of media attention, by issuing challenges to Harper for one-on-one debates. In the first couple weeks of the campaign, Ignatieff kept his party in second place in the polls, and his personal ratings exceeded that of Layton for the first time. However opponents frequently criticized Ignatieff's perceived political opportunism, particularly during the leaders debates when Layton criticized Ignatieff for having a poor attendance record for Commons votes saying "You know, most Canadians, if they don't show up for work, they don't get a promotion". Ignatieff failed to defend himself against these charges, and the debates were said to be a turning point for his party's campaign. Ignatieff was also subject to scathing attack ads by the Conservative Party, slamming him as "Just visiting" Canada for the sake of political advancement. Near the end of the campaign, a late surge in support for Layton and the NDP relegated Ignatieff and the Liberals to third in the polls.

On May 2, 2011, Ignatieff's Liberals lost 43 seats only winning 34 and thus slipped to third party status behind the NDP and the Conservatives, who gained a majority in Parliament. It was the worst result in the history of the Liberal Party, the worst result in Canadian history for an incumbent Official Opposition party, and the first time since Confederation the Liberals failed to finish first or second. Ignatieff was defeated by Conservative challenger Bernard Trottier, being the first incumbent Leader of the Official Opposition to lose his own seat since Charles Tupper's defeat in Cape Breton in 1900, as well as the first sitting Liberal leader since Mackenzie King lost his riding in the 1945 election. Reports suggested that Ignatieff had initially promised to move into a home inside his riding, but instead he resided in the downtown Toronto neighbourhood of Yorkville, which rankled Etobicoke–Lakeshore residents and reinforced perceptions of Ignatieff's political opportunism.

On May 3, 2011, Ignatieff announced that he would be resigning as leader of the party pending the appointment of an interim leader; his resignation went into effect on May 25 when Bob Rae was appointed as Ignatieff's interim replacement.

In 2013 Ignatieff published a book about his political career called Fire and Ashes: Success and Failure in Politics. The British reviewer David Runciman commented in a book review, "for a clear-eyed, sharply observed, mordant but ultimately hopeful account of contemporary politics this memoir is hard to beat. After his defeat, a friend tries to comfort him by telling him that at least he'll get a book out of it. Ignatieff reacts with understandable fury. He didn't go into politics and through all that followed just to write a book. Still, it's some book."

Notable political stances

International affairs 
In October 2006, Ignatieff indicated that he personally would not support ballistic missile defence nor the weaponization of space. He referred to the likelihood of America developing a Missile Defense System in his book Virtual War, but did not voice support for Canadian participation in such a scheme.

On June 3, 2008, and on March 30, 2009, Ignatieff voted in support of non-binding motions in the House of Commons calling on the government to "allow conscientious objectors ... to a war not sanctioned by the United Nations ... [(including Iraq war resisters)] ... to ... remain in Canada ... ." However, on September 29, 2010, when those motions were proposed as a binding private member's bill from Liberal MP Gerard Kennedy, CTV News reported that Ignatieff "walked out during the vote." The bill then failed to pass this second reading vote by seven votes.

Extension of Canada's Afghanistan mission 

During his time in Parliament, Ignatieff was one of the few opposition members supporting the minority Conservative government's commitment to Canadian military activity in Afghanistan. Prime Minister Stephen Harper called a vote in the House of Commons for May 17, 2006, on extending the Canadian Forces current deployment in Afghanistan until February 2009. During the debate, Ignatieff expressed his "unequivocal support for the troops in Afghanistan, for the mission, and also for the renewal of the mission." He argued that the Afghanistan mission tests the success of Canada's shift from "the peacekeeping paradigm to the peace-enforcement paradigm," the latter combining "military, reconstruction and humanitarian efforts together." The opposition Liberal caucus of 102 MPs was divided, with 24 MPs supporting the extension, 66 voting against, and 12 abstentions. Among Liberal leadership candidates, Ignatieff and Scott Brison voted for the extension. Ignatieff led the largest Liberal contingent of votes in favour, with at least five of his caucus supporters voting along with him to extend the mission.
The vote was 149–145 for extending the military deployment. Following the vote, Harper shook Ignatieff's hand. In a subsequent campaign appearance, Ignatieff reiterated his view of the mission in Afghanistan. He stated: "the thing that Canadians have to understand about Afghanistan is that we are well past the era of Pearsonian peacekeeping."

Climate change policy 
In the 2006 Liberal leadership race, Ignatieff advocated for measures to address climate change, including a carbon tax. During the 2008 federal election Dion's key policy plank was his Green Shift plan, a revenue neutral carbon tax which would put a price on greenhouse gas emissions while reducing income taxes. The Green Shift had been heavily criticized by the Conservatives and it was believed to have been a significant factor in the party's poor showing in the election. Following the election Ignatieff announced he would not campaign on Dion's Green Shift. In a speech to the Edmonton Chamber of Commerce in February 2009, he said; "You can't win elections if you're adding to the input costs of a farmer putting diesel into his tractor, or you're adding to the input costs of a fisherman putting diesel into his fishing boat, or a trucker transporting goods". He went onto say that; "You've got to work with the grain of Canadians and not against them. I think we learned a lesson in the last election." In November 2009, he announced that a Liberal government would implement an industrial cap-and-trade system to combat climate change.

Forming of a potential coalition government 
During the spring 2011 federal election, Ignatieff clearly ruled out the formation of a coalition government with the NDP and Bloc parties.  Contrary to the suggestion from the Conservative party that he was planning to form a government with the other opposition parties, Ignatieff issued a statement on March 26, 2011, stating that "[t]he party that wins the most seats on election day will form the government".

Honorary degrees 
Ignatieff had received 11 honorary doctorates as of June 2009 including:

Honorary degrees

Electoral record

Bibliography

Books
Novels
Asya (1991)
Scar Tissue
 Charlie Johnson in the Flames, 2005

Non-fiction

 A Just Measure of Pain: Penitentiaries in the Industrial Revolution, 1780–1850, 1978
 (ed. with István Hont) Wealth and Virtue: The Shaping of Political Economy in the Scottish Enlightenment, Cambridge University Press, 1983. 
 The Needs of Strangers, Chatto and Windus, London 1984
 The Russian Album, 1987
 Blood and Belonging: Journeys Into the New Nationalism, 1994
 Warrior's Honour: Ethnic War and the Modern Conscience, 1997
 Isaiah Berlin: A Life, 1998
 Virtual War: Kosovo and Beyond, 2000
 The Rights Revolution, Viking, 2000
 Human Rights as Politics and Idolatry, Anansi Press Ltd, 2001
 Empire Lite: Nation-Building in Bosnia, Kosovo and Afghanistan, Minerva, 2003
 The Lesser Evil: Political Ethics in an Age of Terror, Princeton University Press, 2004 (2003 Gifford Lectures; sample chapters)
 American Exceptionalism and Human Rights (ed.), Princeton University Press, 2005
 True Patriot Love, Penguin Group Canada, 2009
 Fire and Ashes: Success and Failure in Politics, Random House Canada, 2013
 The Ordinary Virtues: Moral Order in a Divided World, Harvard University Press, 2017
 On Consolation: Finding Solace in Dark Times, Metropolitan Books, 2021

In committee

Essays and reporting 
 "The Meaning of Diana", Prospect, October 23, 1997.
 "Getting Iraq Wrong", The New York Times Magazine, August 5, 2007.
 "What I Would Do If I Were The Prime Minister". Maclean's, September 4, 2006.
 "The Broken Contract", The New York Times Magazine, September 25, 2005.
 "Iranian Lessons", The New York Times Magazine, July 17, 2005.
 "Who Are Americans to Think That Freedom Is Theirs to Spread?", The New York Times Magazine, June 26, 2005.
 "The Uncommitted", The New York Times Magazine, January 30, 2005.
 "The Terrorist as Auteur", The New York Times Magazine, November 14, 2004.
 "Mirage in the Desert", The New York Times Magazine, June 27, 2004.
 "Could We Lose the War on Terror?: Lesser Evils", (cover story), The New York Times Magazine, May 2, 2004.
 
"The Year of Living Dangerously", The New York Times Magazine, March 14, 2004.
 "Arms and the Inspector", Los Angeles Times, March 14, 2004.
 Peace, Order and Good Government: A Foreign Policy Agenda for Canada, OD Skelton Lecture, Department of Foreign Affairs and International Trade, Ottawa, March 12, 2004.
 Why America Must Know Its Limits, Financial Times, December 24, 2003.
 A Mess of Intervention. Peacekeeping. Pre-emption. Liberation. Revenge. When should we send in the Troops?, The New York Times Magazine [cover story], September 7, 2003.
 I am Iraq, The New York Times Magazine, March 31, 2003 [Reprinted in The Guardian and The National Post].
 American Empire: The Burden, (cover story), The New York Times Magazine, January 5, 2003.
 Acceptance Speech from the 2003 Hannah Arendt Prize for Political Thinking
 Mission Impossible?, A Review of A Bed for the Night: Humanitarianism in Crisis, by David Rieff (Simon and Schuster, 2002), Printed in The New York Review of Books, December 19, 2002.
 When a Bridge Is Not a Bridge, New York Times Magazine, October 27, 2002.
 The Divided West, The Financial Times, August 31, 2002.
 Nation Building Lite, (cover story) The New York Times Magazine, July 28, 2002.
 The Rights Stuff, New York Times of Books, June 13, 2002.
 No Exceptions?, Legal Affairs, May/June 2002.
 Why Bush Must Send in His Troops, The Guardian, April 19, 2002.
 Barbarians at the Gates?, The New York Times Book Review, February 18, 2002.
 Is the Human Rights Era Ending?, New York Times, February 5, 2002.
 Intervention and State Failure, Dissent, Winter 2002.
 Kaboul-Sarajevo: Les nouvelles frontières de l'empire, Seuil, 2002.

Television reviews

Screenplays 
 Onegin, 1999 (with Peter Ettedgui)
 1919, 1985 (with Hugh Brody)

Drama 
 Dialogue in the Dark (1989), for the BBC

See also 

 List of Canadian Leaders of the Opposition
 Official Opposition (Canada)

References

External links 

 Michael Ignatieff Homepage

 Michael Ignatieff Biography from contemporarywriters.com
 
 "Michael Grant Ignatieff" from The Canadian Encyclopedia
 

1947 births
Living people
21st-century Canadian politicians
Academics of the London School of Economics
Academics of the University of London
Academics of the University of Oxford
Alumni of the University of Oxford
Canadian expatriate academics in the United States
Canadian expatriates in Hungary
20th-century Canadian historians
Canadian legal scholars
Canadian male novelists
Canadian people of Russian descent
Canadian people of Scottish descent
Canadian philosophers
Academic staff of Central European University
Fellows of King's College, Cambridge
Governor General's Award-winning non-fiction writers
Harvard Graduate School of Arts and Sciences alumni
Harvard University faculty
International law scholars
Isaiah Berlin scholars
Leaders of the Liberal Party of Canada
Leaders of the Opposition (Canada)
Liberal Party of Canada MPs
Members of the House of Commons of Canada from Ontario
Members of the Order of Canada
Politicians from Toronto
Responsibility to protect
Scholars of nationalism
The New York Review of Books people
Trinity College (Canada) alumni
Academic staff of the University of British Columbia
University of Toronto alumni
Academic staff of the University of Toronto
Upper Canada College alumni
Carnegie Council for Ethics in International Affairs